Failaka Island (  / ; Kuwaiti Arabic: فيلچا ) is a Kuwaiti Island in the Persian Gulf. The island is 20 km off the coast of Kuwait City in the Persian Gulf. The name "Failaka" is thought to be derived from the ancient Greek  –  "outpost".

Failaka Island is located 50 km southeast of the spot where the Tigris and Euphrates Rivers empty into the Persian Gulf. For thousands of years, the island has been a strategic prize to control the lucrative trade that passed up and down the Persian Gulf. Failaka Island has been a strategic location since the rise of the Sumerian city-state of Ur.

History

Antiquity
Failaka has been a strategic location since the rise of the Sumerian city-state of Ur during the third millennium BC. Mesopotamians first settled in the Kuwaiti island of Failaka in 2000 B.C. Traders from the Sumerian city of Ur inhabited Failaka and ran a mercantile business. The island had many Mesopotamian-style buildings typical of those found in Iraq dating from around 2000 B.C.  

In 4000 BC until 2000 BC, the bay of Kuwait was home to the Dilmun civilization. Dilmun's control of the bay of Kuwait included mainland Akkaz, Umm an Namil Island, and Failaka Island. At its peak in 2000 BC, the Dilmun empire controlled the trade routes from Mesopotamia to India and the Indus Valley civilization.

During the Dilmun era (from ca. 3000 BC), Failaka was known as "Agarum", the land of Enzak, a great god in the Dilmun civilization according to Sumerian cuneiform texts found on the island. During the Neo-Babylonian Period, Enzak was identified with Nabu, the ancient Mesopotamian patron god of literacy, the rational arts, scribes and wisdom. As part of Dilmun, Failaka became a hub for the civilization from the end of the 3rd to the middle of the 1st millennium BC. Failaka was settled following 2000 BC after a drop in sea level. 

From about 1650 BC there is a further inscription on a seal found at Failaka and preserving a king's name. The short text readsː [La]'ù-la Panipa, daughter of Sumu-lěl, the servant of Inzak of Akarum. Sumu-lěl was evidently a third king of Dilmun belonging to about this period. Servant of Inzak of Akarum was the king's title in Dilmun. The names of these later rulers are Amoritic. 

Despite the scholarly consensus that ancient Dilmun encompasses three modern locations - the eastern littoral of Arabia from the vicinity of modern Kuwait to Bahrain; the island of Bahrain; the island of Failaka of Kuwait - few researchers have taken into account the radically different geography of the basin represented by the Persian Gulf before its reflooding as sea levels rose about 6000 BCE.

Dilmun's commercial power began to decline after 1800 BC. Piracy flourished throughout the region during Dilmun's decline. After 600 BC, the Babylonians added Dilmun to their empire. 

After the Dilmun civilization, Failaka was inhabited by the Kassites of Mesopotamia, and was formally under the control of the Kassite dynasty of Babylon. Studies indicate traces of human settlement can be found on Failaka dating back to as early as the end of the 3rd millennium BC, and extending until the 20th century AD. Many of the artifacts found in Falaika are linked to Mesopotamian civilizations and seem to show that Failaka was gradually drawn toward the civilization based in Antioch. 

Under Nebuchadnezzar II, Failaka was under Babylonian control. Cuneiform documents found in Failaka indicate the presence of Babylonians in the island's population. Babylonian Kings were present in Failaka during the Neo-Babylonian Empire period, Nabonidus had a governor in Failaka and Nebuchadnezzar II had a palace and temple in Falaika. Failaka also contained temples dedicated to the worship of Shamash, the Mesopotamian sun god in the Babylonian pantheon.

After an apparent abandonment of about seven centuries,  the bay of Kuwait was repopulated during the Achaemenid period (c. 550‒330 BC). In 4th century BC, the ancient Greeks colonized the bay of Kuwait under Alexander the Great, the ancient Greeks named mainland Kuwait Larissa and Failaka was named Ikaros. 

According to Strabo and Arrian, Alexander the Great named Failaka Ikaros because it resembled the Aegean island of that name in size and shape. Various elements of Greek mythology were mixed with the local cults in Failaka. "Ikaros" was also the name of a prominent city situated in Failaka. 

According to another account, having returned from his Indian campaign to Persia, Alexander the Great ordered the island to be called Icarus, after the Icarus island in the Aegean Sea. This was likely a Hellenization of the local name Akar (Aramaic 'KR), derived from the ancient bronze-age toponym Agarum. Another suggestion is that the name Ikaros was influenced by the local É-kara temple, dedicated to the Babylonian sun-god Shamash. That both Failaka and the Aegean Icarus housed bull cults would have made the identification tempting all the more.

During Hellenistic times, there was a temple of Artemis on the island. The wild animals on the island were dedicated to goddess and no one should harm them. Strabo wrote that on the island there was a temple of Apollo and an oracle of Artemis (Tauropolus) (μαντεῖον Ταυροπόλου). The island is also mentioned by Stephanus of Byzantium and Ptolemaeus.

Remains of the settlement include a large Hellenistic fort and two Greek temples. Failaka was also a trading post (emporion) of the kingdom of Characene. At the Hellenistic fortress in Failaka, pigs represented 20 percent of the total population, but no pig remains were found in nearby Akkaz. 

Nearchos was likely the first Greek to have explored Failaka. The island was further visited and inspected by Archias, Androsthenes of Thasos, and Hiero during three exploration expeditions ordered by Alexander the Great during 324 BC. Failaka might have been fortified and settled during the days of Seleucus I or Antiochos I. 

At the time of Alexander the Great, the mouth of the Euphrates River was located in northern Kuwait. The Euphrates river flowed directly into the Persian Gulf via Khor Subiya which was a river channel at the time. Failaka was located 15 kilometers from the mouth of the Euphrates river. By the first century BC, the Khor Subiya river channel dried out completely.

In 127 BC, the kingdom of Characene was established around Teredon in present day Kuwait. Characene was centered in the region encompassing southern Mesopotamia, including Failaka island. A busy Parthian era Characene commercial station existed on Failaka island. 

Failaka was also under the influence of the Achaemenid Empire. There are Aramaic inscriptions that testify Achaemenid presence.

There are also late Sassanian and early-to-late Islamic era settlements across Failaka.  

Christian Nestorian settlements flourished in Failaka from the 5th century until the 9th century. Excavations have revealed several farms, villages and two large churches dating from the 5th and 6th century. Archaeologists are currently excavating nearby sites to understand the extent of the settlements that flourished in the eighth and ninth centuries A.D. An old island tradition is that a community grew up around a Christian mystic and hermit. The small farms and villages were eventually abandoned. Remains of Byzantine era Nestorian churches were found at Al-Qusur in Failaka. Pottery at the site can be dated from as early as the first half of the 7th century through the 9th century.

Modern era

Prior to the 1990 Iraqi Invasion, the island had over two thousand residents and several schools. The village of Al-Zawr is situated near the middle of the northwest side of the island. It was the longest continuously inhabited location in Kuwait. During 1990 and 1991, the invading Iraqis depopulated the island, expelling all of its residents to the mainland. The Iraqi military mined the beaches and used the island's facilities and buildings for target practice. In 1991, the allied forces forced the Iraqi army forces occupying the island to surrender through bombing and psywar operations. The sewage system was destroyed and has yet to be fully repaired. Also, many old homes continue to sit empty and decaying.

After the war, Failaka was cleared of mines, but it remains under military use to some extent. Nevertheless, Failaka Island is becoming a popular holiday destination from Kuwait City since the establishment of the "Wanasa Beach" resort including live music, horse-riding, canoeing, and kayaking activities.

Climate, geography and the future
Failaka Island is located in the northern part of the Persian Gulf. Springtime on Failaka Island is regarded as particularly special by Kuwaitis. Failaka has quite a different ecosystem than mainland Kuwait and its budding flowers and changing temperatures are much appreciated. Although the island's infrastructure remains poor, Failaka is beginning to develop a local tourist industry based upon fishing, boating, swimming, sailing and other water sports.

The few remaining local residents are mostly those Failakawans who lived with their families on the island prior to the Iraqi Invasion of 1990. Most Failakawans have their own boats; while some are involved in tourism many others reticent about letting tourism detract from the quiet island life. Some Failakawan families, although now living in mainland Kuwait, regularly go to the island on weekends.

On the mainland, in Kuwait City, there have been various schemes to build a bridge to the island and develop Failaka into a vacation paradise. A new hotel resort has encouraged many of the improvements.

Archaeology 
Failaka is a principal center of archaeology in Kuwait. Since the fieldwork conducted by the Danish team under the supervision of Geoffrey Bibby in the 1950s, archaeologists from France, the United States, Slovakia, Italy, Greece, and, more recently, from Poland and Georgia have worked there.

Population
The majority of Kuwaitis from Failaka Island are of Iranian ancestry. They originally migrated to Failaka from the Iranian coast, mainly Kharg Island and Bandar Lengeh. These people are commonly known as the Huwala in the GCC states. They are predominantly Sunni Muslims and speak Arabic fluently, although prior to the discovery of oil they also spoke Persian fluently. The most important Huwala settlement in Failaka Island pertained to 40 families who migrated from the Iranian island Kharg to Failaka in the years 1841–1842. The most recent settlement occurred in the early 1930s after the imposition of the unveiling law by Reza Shah. A minority of Failaka Island's Kuwaiti families are Shia Persians, they were noted as having their own hussainiyas and the older generations were frequent Arabic speakers, unlike the Kuwaiti Shia of Persian origin in mainland Kuwait City at the time.

See also

 Ikaros (Failaka Island)
 Agarum
 H3 (Kuwait)
 Bahra 1
 Kazma
 Umm an Namil Island
 Shuwaikh Island
 Subiya, Kuwait

Notes

Further reading
Hellenistic Failaka
H.E. Mathiesen et al., Ikaros: The Hellenistic Settlements, 4 vols. (Copenhagen, 1982–1989).
C. Roueché and S. Sherwin-White, 'Some aspects of the Seleucid Empire: The Greek inscriptions from Failaka in the Persian Gulf' Chiron 15 (1985) 1–39.
J. Naveh, 'The inscriptions from Failaka and the lapidary Aramaic script' Bulletin of the American Schools of Oriental Research 297 (1995) 1–4.

Bibliography

External links

 Kuwaiti-Slovak Archaeological Mission (KSAM)
 nautical description
 BBC News article
 Water Supply to Failaka Island

Islands of Kuwait
Archaeological sites in Kuwait
History of Kuwait
Mesopotamia